Henry Hudson Kitson (April 9, 1863, 1864 or 1865 – June 26, 1947) was an English-American sculptor who sculpted many representations of American military heroes.

Romania's Queen Elisabeth knighted him after he sculpted a marble bust of her in the early 1900s.

His student and first wife, Theo Alice Ruggles Kitson was a sculptor as well, and his brothers, John William Kitson, Samuel James Kitson, and Robert Lewellen Kitson, also had art careers in the United States. He is perhaps best known in the U.S. for his sculpture of the "Minute Man" on Lexington Green, in Lexington, Massachusetts.

Life
Harry, as he was known by his numerous brothers and sisters, migrated to the United States about 1877/8 where he apprenticed with his oldest brother John William Kitson.  William Kitson was in business with another Englishman Robert Ellin; their firm, Ellin & Kitson, were identified as architectural sculptors. They specialized in interior carving and wood work in commercial structures and churches. Some buildings they worked on were the Equitable Building, the Tilden Mansion, the Astor Memorial Redos and the William K. Vanderbilt House.

Harry and Samuel James Kitson the next oldest brother were both associated with Ellin & Kitson doing sculptural work. According to family oral history, William now quite successful encouraged and financially provided for Harry Kitson to move to Paris 1n 1882 where he studied at the École des Beaux-Arts under the sculptor Jean-Marie Bonnassieux and sculptor Dumont. Kitson also was enrolled in the École nationale supérieure des arts décoratifs studying under Millet and Ganter. He returned first in 1884/5 to NYC to his eldest brother William's business but in 1886 removed to Boston where his sculptor brother Sam had established a studio. Once there Kitson received numerous commissions and began teaching. His students included portrait sculptor Leila Usher. John William Kitson died in 1888 and Samuel James had returned to Boston after a stay in Washington, DC. The youngest brother, Robert Lewellen Kitson, a water-colorist, joined his older brothers in Boston about 1902.

In 1893, Henry married Theo Alice Ruggles, a former student of his, who went on to have a successful career of her own as Theo Alice Ruggles Kitson. Theo and Harry had three children: Theo (called Babs), John, who became a civil engineer, and Dorothy. None of the children had issue. The noted sculptor Gaston Lachaise worked in his atelier.  Many of Henry Hudson Kitson papers are in the Archives of American Art in Washington, D.C., as well as the New York Historical Society.  Kitson only carried a British passport.

He was the author of numerous public monuments, and left behind his home, Santarella, in Tyringham. The home, which Kitson modified extensively, was recently restored and now operates as a special events venue as well as providing overnight accommodation.

Gallery

Vicksburg National Military Park

Selected works 
 Vicksburg National Military Park has the following works by Kitson:
 Confederate President Jefferson Davis (statue) 1927
 Iowa Monument  (six relief panels 1906 and equestrian statue 1912)
 Iowa Governor Samuel J. Kirkwood (bust) 1928
 Union Brig. Gen. Mortimer D. Leggett (relief portrait) 1911
 Confederate Brig. Gen. Stephen D. Lee (statue) 1909 (first chairman of the Vicksburg NMP Commission)
 Union Maj. Gustavus Lightfoot (relief portrait) 1914
 Union Adm. David Glasgow Farragut (statue on Navy Monument) 1917
 Union Lt. William T. Rigby (bust) 1928 (Resident Commissioner of VNMP 1899-1929)
 Union Lt. Cmdr. Thomas O. Selfridge, Jr. (bust) 1913
 Confederate Maj. Gen. Martin L. Smith (bust) 1911
 Boston area
 Nathaniel P. Banks, Waltham, Massachusetts
 David Farragut, Marine Park, South Boston, Massachusetts, 1881
 Thomas A. Doyle (mayor) monument, Providence, Rhode Island 1889
 Minute man statue, Lexington, Massachusetts town green 1900 (often mistaken to be of minuteman Captain John Parker)
 Roger Conant statue at Salem, Massachusetts 1905
 Robert Burns 1920 Back Bay Fens, Boston. Relocated to Winthrop Square, Boston 1975. Returned to its original Fens location October 2019.
 Henry B. Endicott tablet, Boston, Massachusetts 1921
 The Pilgrim Maiden statue, Brewster Gardens, Plymouth, Massachusetts 1922
 Sir Richard Saltonstall monument, Watertown, Massachusetts 1931
 Kentucky
 Lloyd Tilghman Memorial in Paducah, Kentucky

References

Family letters, business letters, photos and other documents held by family historian
Frank Torrey Robinson, "Living New England Artists: Biographical Sketches...", S. E. Cassino, Publisher Boston 1888 pgs 113-119
Columbia Publishing Company, MA {(Massachusetts Of Today: A Memorial of the State, Historical and Biographical)}, 1892 by Toomey & Juinn, Page 172

External links
 Santarella
 Berkshireweb.com
 History of Santarella
 The Kitson Papers 1887-1934 at the New York Historical Society

American architectural sculptors
American alumni of the École des Beaux-Arts
People from Huddersfield
1864 births
1947 deaths
English emigrants to the United States
20th-century American sculptors
20th-century American male artists
19th-century American sculptors
19th-century American male artists
American male sculptors
People from Tyringham, Massachusetts